Sven Fredrik Stray (born 29 January 1985) is a Norwegian professional footballer who plays as a defender for Norwegian club Arendal.

Club career
His former clubs are FK Vigør, Mandalskameratene and Odd Grenland. In 2009, he was loaned out to Bryne FK. Ahead of the 2010 season he joined Flekkerøy IL. Ahead of the 2015 season he went from FK Jerv to Arendal Fotball. In mid-2017 he stepped down two notches to Fløy, wanting more time with his family. Fløy won promotion to the third tier.

International
On 19 January 2005 Stray making his debut after being named in the starting line-up with Norway U21 in a match of friendly match against South Korea U21.

References

External links
Profile at Altomfotball

1985 births
Living people
Norwegian footballers
Association football defenders
Mandalskameratene players
Odds BK players
Bryne FK players
Flekkerøy IL players
FK Jerv players
Eliteserien players
Norwegian First Division players
Arendal Fotball players
Footballers from Oslo